The Alsace single territorial collectivity referendum was a referendum held on Sunday, 7 April 2013 in Alsace, France, which aimed at the creation of the single territorial collectivity of Alsace through the merging of the regional council of Alsace and the departmental councils of Bas-Rhin and Haut-Rhin. Even though there was a 57.65% majority of "Yes" votes, the project was not approved, as two other requirements (a majority in favour in both departments and a voter quorum) were not met.

Criteria 
In order for the proposal to be approved, the votes in favour needed to be a majority in both departments (and at least 50% overall) and represent at least 25% of eligible voters ( votes in Bas-Rhin and  votes in Haut-Rhin).

Opinions

Political parties 
NB: These are the opinions expressed by the national boards of each party, even if there might be different opinions inside the parties.

Yes
 Union for a Popular Movement
 Europe Ecology – The Greens
 Democratic Movement
 Unser Land
 Alsace d'abord
 Union of Democrats and Independents

No
 National Front, officially from 11 March
 Left Front (France) (including Left Party and French Communist Party)
 New Anticapitalist Party
 Debout la République
 Citizen and Republican Movement
 Republican Popular Union

No opinion
 Socialist Party (France) (PS)
 PS 68 and independent elected representatives – Alsace: Yes
 Intergroupe élus socialistes et républicains d'Alsace: No

Opinions of politicians 

In alphabetical order

 Support : François Bayrou (MoDem), André Bord (ex-RPR), Charles Buttner (UMP), Jean-François Copé (UMP), Jacques Fernique (EELV), Laurent Furst (UMP), Henri Goetschy (MoDem), Daniel Hoeffel (DVD), Guy-Dominique Kennel (UMP), Hervé Morin (NC), Philippe Richert (UMP), Jo Spiegel (PS), Yann Wehrling (MoDem).
 Against : François Asselineau (UPR), Martine Binder (FN), Nicolas Dupont-Aignan (DLR), Nicolas Chevalier-Roch (DLR), Pierre Freyburger (PS), Constant Goerg (DVD), Pierre Laurent (PCF), Marine Le Pen (FN), Jean-Luc Mélenchon (PG), Gilbert Meyer (UMP), Raphaël Nisand (PS).

Results

Bas-Rhin

Haut-Rhin

Debates after the poll 
The negative result of the April referendum was called into question in July 2013 as part of the draft law concerning the "modernization of territorial public action" and the "affirmation of metropolises", with amendment no 745 of UMP MP Hervé Gaymard abolishing the requirement for a referendum consultation to change the size of local authorities. After several delays, the Mixed Parity Committee finally abolished it in December 2013. However, on 25 June 2014, an amendment by rapporteur Michel Delebarre (PS), adopted on 4 July, "abolishes the compulsory consultation of voters in the event of a change in the boundaries of regions and departments as well as in the event of a merger".

In Alsace, on 22 September 2014, the elected representatives of the two general councils and those of the regional council voted 101 out of 122 in favour of a motion for the return of the council of Alsace as the only alternative to the territorial reform of the government which proposes the merger of Alsace, Lorraine and Champagne-Ardenne. A demonstration with ambivalent demands (against the Grand Est region, but also for the single council of Alsace) was co-organized by the regional elected representatives on 11 October, with the implementation of a single TER fare at €5 for demonstrators, throughout the region (the prefect has also announced that he will initiate a check of its legality). It brings together 7,000 to 8,000 people according to the authorities and 10,000 to 20,000 according to the organizers. In the debates of the Senate, which finally ended in favour of a unified Alsace in some form, the question of a single council of Alsace has also come up regularly on the table.

The two departments would eventually be grouped together into the European Collectivity of Alsace in January 2021.

References 

Alsace
Alsace referendum
Politics of Alsace
Referendums in France